Ulmus wallichiana var. tomentosa was identified by Melville & Heybroek after the latter's expedition to the Himalaya in 1960.

Description
The tree is very similar to Ulmus wallichiana subsp. wallichiana, but distinguished by young stems and lower surfaces of leaves densely white-tomentose; the samarae are uniformly hirsute.

Pests and diseases
The species has a high resistance to the fungus Ophiostoma himal-ulmi endemic to the Himalaya and the cause of Dutch elm disease there.

Cultivation
The tree is not known to be in cultivation in the West.

References

Melville, R. & Heybroek, H. (1971). Elms of the Himalaya. Kew Bulletin, Vol. 26 (1). Kew, London.

External links

wallichiana var. tomentosa
Flora of West Himalaya
Trees of Pakistan
Vulnerable plants
Ulmus articles missing images
Elm species and varieties